The Myanmar Air Force, known until 1989 as the Burmese Air Force, is the aerial branch of Myanmar's armed forces, the Tatmadaw. The primary mission of the Myanmar Air Force (MAF) since its inception has been to provide transport, logistical, and close air support to the Myanmar Army in counter-insurgency operations. It is mainly used in internal conflicts in Myanmar, and, on a smaller scale, in relief missions, especially after the deadly Cyclone Nargis of May 2008. Since the military coup in February 2021, Myanmar Air Force aircraft have been used in airstrikes on villages.

History

Post-Independence era (1948–1990)
The Myanmar Air Force (MAF) was formed as the Burmese Air Force on 16 January 1947, while Burma (as Myanmar was known until 1989) was still under British rule. By 1948, the fleet of the new air force included 40 Airspeed Oxfords, 16 de Havilland Tiger Moths, four Austers, and three Supermarine Spitfires transferred from the Royal Air Force, and had a few hundred personnel.

The Mingaladon Air Base HQ, the main air base in the country, was formed on 16 June 1950. No.1 Squadron, Equipment Holding Unit and Air High Command - Burma Air Force, and the Flying Training School, were placed under the jurisdiction of the base. A few months later, on 18 December 1950, No. 2 Squadron was formed with nine Douglas Dakotas as a transport squadron. In 1953, the Advanced Flying Unit was formed under the Mingaladon Air Base with de Havilland Vampire T55s, and by the end of 1953 the Burmese Air Force had three main airbases, at Mingaladon, Hmawbi, and Meiktila, in central Burma.

In 1953, the Burmese Air Force bought 30 Supermarine Spitfires from Israel and 20 Supermarine Seafires from the United Kingdom, and in 1954 it bought 40 Percival Provost T-53s and 8 de Havilland Vampire Mark T55s from the United Kingdom. In late 1955, the Burmese Air Force formed a Maintenance Air Base in Mingaladon, No. 501 Squadron Group (Hmawbi Airbase) and No. 502 Squadron Group (Mingaladon Air Base). In 1956, the Burmese Air Force bought 10 Cessna 180 aircraft from the United States. The same year, 6 Kawasaki Bell 47Gs formed its first helicopter unit. The following year, the Burmese Air Force procured 21 Hawker Sea Fury aircraft from the United Kingdom and 9 de Havilland Canada DHC-3 Otters from Canada. In 1958, it procured 7 additional Kawasaki Bell 47Gs and 12 Vertol H-21 Shawnees from the United States. Five years later, No. 503 Squadron Group was formed with No. 51 Squadron (de Havilland Canada DHC-3 Otters and Cessna 180s) and No. 53 Squadron (Bell 47Gs, Kaman HH-43 Huskies, and Aérospatiale Alouettes) in Meiktila.

On 15 February 1961, an unmarked Republic of China Air Force Consolidated PB4Y Privateer came into Burmese air space carrying supplies for Chinese Kuomintang forces fighting in northern Burma, and was intercepted by three Hawker Sea Fury fighters of the Burmese Air Force. The intruding bomber and one Burmese fighter crashed in Thailand during the incident. On 17 February, a team from Burmese 9th Front Brigade left for the crash site. A 12.7mm bullet was fired into the fuselage of UB-466, hitting pilot officer Peter as well, breaking five of his ribs. Pilot officer Peter was recorded in the history of Burmese Air Force as an airman who gave his life for the country and the people.
In 1962, a new radar station in Mingaladon and a mobile radar station in Lwemwe (near Tachileik) were put into operation. By December 1964, the Burmese Air Force had 323 officers and 5,677 other ranks and it acquired Lockheed T-33 Shooting Star jet trainers and a new radar station, which could operate within a 120-mile (193-km) radius, was opened in Namsang. In 1966, the radar arm of the air force underwent a complete overhaul and upgrade, with new radar stations being operated. The Namsang Radar station was upgraded to cover about a 200-mile (322-km) radius and renamed No.71 Squadron. In the same year, the Burmese Air Force formed the No. 1 Airborne Battalion with 26 officers and 750 other ranks.

On 1 January 1967, the Burmese Air Force reorganized its command structure. No. 501 Squadron Group in Hmawbi became No. 501 Air Base HQ; No. 502 Squadron Group in Mingalardon became No. 502 Air Base HQ; and No. 503 Squadron Group in Meiktila became No. 503 Air Base HQ in Meiktila. It also maintained airfield detachments in Lashio and Kengtung to cope with the insurgency of Communist Party of Burma in the northeast border region of the country.

In 1975, the Burmese Air Force took delivery of 18 Bell 205A and seven Bell 206B helicopters from the United States under the International Narcotic Control Program (INCP). In March 1975, it bought 20 SIAI-Marchetti SF.260 trainers from Italy.

Between 1976 and 1987, the Burmese Air Force bought seven Pilatus PC-6 Turbo porter STOL aircraft; and 16 Pilatus PC-7 and 10 Pilatus PC-9 turboprop trainers from Switzerland. These aircraft were deployed in Lashio for close air support in counter-insurgency operations.

Modernisation programme (1990–present)
In the early 1990s, the Burmese Air Force upgraded its facilities and introduced two new air base headquarters and existing air base headquarters were renamed. It also significantly upgraded its radar and electronic warfare facilities. The Burmese Air Force bought more than 100 aircraft from the People's Republic of China, which included F7 IIK interceptors, FT-7 Trainers, A-5C Ground Attack Aircraft, FT-6M trainers, K-8 trainers and Y-8 transport aircraft.

In 1989, the Burmese Air Force was renamed the Myanmar Air Force in accordance with the country changing its name from Burma to Myanmar.

In December 1990, the Myanmar Air Force took the first delivery from China of 10 F7 IIK interceptors and two FT-7 Trainers followed by another batch of 12 F7 IIK interceptors in May 1993. Further deliveries of F7 IIK interceptors were made in 1995, 1998 and 1999.

By 2000, the Myanmar Air Force has received 62 F7 IIK interceptors from China. Israel was contracted to refurbish and upgrade all operational F-7s and FT-7s: these were to get the Elta EL/M-2032 air-to-air radar, Rafael Python Mk. III and even Litening laser-designator pods. The same equipment was then installed on the two-seater FT-7 fighter trainers as well. In a related deal, Israel delivered to Myanmar at least one consignment of laser-guided bombs, but no deliveries of any other weapons are known. Since the Elbit contract was won in 1997, the air force has acquired at least one more squadron of F-7 and FT-7 aircraft from China, but these were not upgraded.

Between 1992 and 2000, the Myanmar Air Force took delivery of 36 A-5C Ground Attack Aircraft from China. In addition, the Myanmar Air Force also bought 20 Soko G-4 Super Galeb armed jet trainers from Yugoslavia in 1991, but only approximately 6 aircraft were delivered due to the break up of Yugoslavia.

The Myanmar Air Force procured a range of helicopters from Russia and Poland between 1991 and 1997; it bought 20 PZL-Swidnik Mil Mi-2 and 13 PZL W-3 Sokol helicopters from Poland and 13 Mil Mi-17 from Russia. These helicopters were put into counter-insurgency operations against ethnic rebels in the Irrawaddy River delta. Four Mil Mi-2, four PZL W-3 Sokol, and two Bell 205 helicopters were grouped as an air detachment stationed in Bogalay for "Operation Monediang" in October 1991. During this operation, Mil Mi-2 helicopters were fitted with a wide range of weapons to provide ground attack and air cover for heliborne air assault operations. Four Mil Mi-2s of the air detachment made a total of 80 sorties over 17 targets with nearly 82 flying hours. Four PZL W-3 Sokol helicopters, unarmed and used for troop transport carrying 20 airborne commandos, each flew 443 missions with 197 flying hours. Bell 205 helicopters carried out search and rescue, and they flew 263 missions with over 114 flying hours.

In 2001, the Myanmar Air Force bought 12 MiG-29 Fighter Aircraft (10 MiG-29Bs and two MiG-29UB two seats trainers) from Belarus. This was followed by an additional order of 20 MiG-29 (10 MiG-29B, 6 MiG-29SE and 4 MiG-29UB) as part of a $570 million defence package in December 2009. 10 MiG-29B were upgraded to SM (mod) standard in 2017. Myanmar Air Force also ordered 10 Mil Mi-35 gunship helicopters as part of a $71 million defence package signed in December 2009.

Despite these modernisation measures, the capability of the Myanmar Air Force remained questionable, due to its absence during the Battle of Border Post 9631 with Thailand and the rescue missions related to Cyclone Nargis in May 2008.

A contract had been signed in December 2015 with Pakistan for the purchase of JF-17 Thunder multirole fighter, which was jointly developed by Chengdu Aircraft Industry Group and Pakistan Aeronautical Complex, to Myanmar Air Force. However in March 2018 it was reported that the deal for the purchase of JF-17 Thunder has been suspended by Pakistan. However, four JF-17IIs were seen at Air Force Day celebrated in December 2018. Under a bilateral contract, the MAF ordered six Su-30SM fighters from Russia in 2018.

Commanders in Chief and Chiefs of Air Staff since 1948

Commander-in-Chief and Chief of Air Staff in chronological order:

Rank structure

Commissioned officer ranks
The rank insignia of commissioned officers.

Other ranks
The rank insignia of non-commissioned officers and enlisted personnel.

Organisations
Personnel: 23,000 all ranks (including 1 Airborne (Paratroop) Battalion with twenty six officers and 750 other personnel of other ranks).
Air Force headquarters, Ministry of Defence (Naypyitaw)
Aircraft Production and Repair Base Headquarters (Hmawbi)
Air Force - Ground Training Base (Meiktila)
Air Force - Fly Training Base (Shante)

Air bases
Pathein Air Base HQ
Hmawbi Air Base HQ (former 501 Air Base)
Mingaladon Air Base HQ (former 502 Air Base)
Magway Air Base HQ 
Myitkyina Air Base HQ (former 503 Air Base)
Myeik Air Base HQ
Namsang Air Base HQ
Taungoo Air Base HQ 
Shante Air Base HQ is close to Meikhtila in neighboring Pyitharyar
Meiktila Air Base - helicopter training and operations base
Homemalin Air Base HQ

Myanmar Air Force also utilised civilian airfields as front-line air fields in case of foreign invasion.

Air Defence 

The Office of the chief of Air Defence is one of the major branches of Tatmadaw. It was established as the Air Defence Command in 1997 but was not fully operational until late 1999. It was renamed the Bureau of Air Defence in the early 2000s.In early 2000s, Tatmadaw established the Myanmar Integrated Air Defence System (MIADS) with help from Russia, Ukraine and China. It is a tri-service bureau with units from all three branches of Myanmar Armed Forces. All Air Defence assets except Anti-Aircraft Artillery are integrated into MIADS.

Aircraft

Current inventory

Armament

Radars
The Air Force has several radar installations including the three-dimensional surveillance YLC-2 Radar, the P-37 Early-warning radar system, the JLP-40 defensive radar, and the Galaxy  EWR system, which is linked with Integrated Air Defence office.

Markings
Myanmar national insignia (white triangle with yellow field in the centre and borders in blue) is usually applied on six positions. The serialling system of Myanmar Air Force aircraft is suggested to serve as both – unit and individual aircraft identity, this could not be confirmed so far, however. Most of the older aeroplanes carried the serials with the prefix "UB" and the numbers in Burmese. Sometimes the serials were outlined in white. Combat aircraft generally carry serials in black.

Accidents and incidents
On 11 June 2014, a Mig-29UB caught fire and crashed on to farmland near Myothit township of Magway at 8:30 a.m. (local time). Two pilots safely ejected.

On 10 February 2016, a Beech 1900 aircraft crashed after taking off from Naypidaw Airport, killing 5 military personnels.

On 14 June 2016, a Mi-2 helicopter crashed near the Yangon–Mandalay Expressway at being refueled at the Taungngu airbase, killing three military servicemen on board.

The aircraft was carrying 122 people. There were no survivors.

On 3 April 2018, An F-7 fighter aircraft of Taungoo Air Base has crashed into a farm near KyunKone Village in Taungoo. It is learned that the F-7, which is used as a training aircraft, was believed to have crashed while trying to land the ground at around 11:30 am. It is reported that a pilot was killed on the spot during the crash.

On 16 October 2018, two Myanmar F-7Ms crashed near Magway, Myanmar, killing both pilots and a civilian on the ground. Both aircraft struck a broadcast tower. One plummeted into a rice paddy, while the other nose-dived near a famous Buddhist pagoda in the Magway region of central Myanmar.

On 3 May 2021, one helicopter was shot down near the town of Moemauk in Kachin province by the Kachin Independence Army in response to the MAF's air raid. There was no confirmation from the MAF nor the KIA on which helicopter was shot down and which AA system was used by the KIA in the incident.

On 11 June 2021, a Beechcraft 1900 crashed on its landing approach to Pyin Oo Lwin's airport, killing 12 people including a senior Buddhist monk, the abbot of Zay Kone Monastery in Pyinmana.

On 16 February 2022, A-5 fighter jet crashed near Ohn Taw village in Sagaing Region.

On 29 March 2022, Mi-17 helicopter crashed and injured five people on board near Hakha, Chin State.

See also

Myanmar Army
Myanmar Navy
Military intelligence of Myanmar
Myanmar Police Force

References

Bibliography

Hoyle, Craig. "World Air Forces Directory". Flight International, Vol. 182, No. 5370, 11–17 December 2012. pp. 40–64. .

''World Aircraft Information Files. Brightstar Publishing, London. File 333 Sheet 05

Military of Myanmar
Air forces by country
Military units and formations established in 1947
Aviation in Myanmar
Defence agencies of Myanmar